Whittington High Level railway station is one of two former railway stations in the village of Whittington, Shropshire, England.

History
Whittington High Level railway station was opened as plain "Whittington" by the Cambrian Railways, on their single-track Oswestry to Whitchurch line. The Oswestry, Ellesmere and Whitchurch Railway were in the process of building the station when the company was absorbed into the newly created Cambrian Railways in 1864. The Cambrian itself was incorporated into the GWR at the grouping of 1923. In 1948 both of Whittington's lines and stations became part of the Western Region of British Railways.

In 1924 the two "Whittington" stations in the village were renamed. This station gained the suffix "High Level" and its neighbour on the  GWR's Paddington to Birkenhead main line became .

The line was generally single track with passing loops, one of which was at Whittington High Level station, which was on an embankment. The platforms, station buildings and signalbox were made of wood. The station was damaged by fire in 1958.

The line and station have been demolished.

Passenger services
In 1922 passenger services calling at Whittington High Level were at their most intensive, with trains serving several long-distance destinations as well as locals plying between Whitchurch and Oswestry:

 On Sundays just one Down train called:
 the overnight Euston to  via Whitchurch departed from Whittington High Level at 03:15. Passengers for Aberystwyth would have ample opportunity to catch up on their sleep as it did not arrive there until 09:25. The return left Aberystwyth at 18:10, arriving at Whittington at 21:28.
 On Mondays to Saturdays seven Down trains called:
three through trains to Aberystwyth, one of which contained through carriages from Paddington.
two locals to Oswestry, plus one "Motor Car" service; whether this was on road or rail is unclear
one stopping service to 
 these were all balanced by Up workings.

References

Notes

Sources

Further reading

External links
 Whittington High and Low Level stations on old O.S. map npe Maps

Disused railway stations in Shropshire
Former Cambrian Railway stations
Railway stations in Great Britain opened in 1864
Railway stations in Great Britain closed in 1960
1864 establishments in England